The 1995 ATP St. Pölten, also known as OTV Raiffeisen Grand Prix for sponsorship reasons, is a men's tennis tournament played in St. Poelten, Austria on outdoor  clay courts. The tournament was held from 19 June until 26 June 1995 and was part of the ATP World Series of the 1995 ATP Tour.

First-seeded Thomas Muster won the singles title, his 4th win at the event after 1994, 1993, and 1988.

Finals

Singles
 Thomas Muster defeated  Bohdan Ulihrach 6-3, 3–6, 6–1
 It was Muster's 7th singles title of the year and the 30th of his career.

Doubles
 Bill Behrens /  Matt Lucena defeated  Libor Pimek /  Byron Talbot 7–5, 6–4

References

Hypo Group Tennis International
Hypo Group Tennis International
Hypo